The Special Committee to Investigate Israeli Practices Affecting the Human Rights of the Palestinian People and Other Arabs of the Occupied Territories, also called Special Committee on Israeli Practices, was established by United Nations General Assembly Resolution 2443 (XXIII) of 19 December 1968 in order to monitor "respect for and implementation of human rights in occupied territories." The committee comprises representatives of three member states appointed by the President of the General Assembly. In June 2019 the committee was composed of Malaysia, Senegal and Sri Lanka.

The Special Committee was created to investigate Israeli settlements in the disputed territories. It prepares yearly General Assembly draft resolutions and other documents. It reports to the General Assembly through the Fourth Committee on matters related to Israeli settlements, the applicability of the Fourth Geneva Convention and the Palestinian Right of Return. The latest report was published on 24 June 2019. The mandate of the Special Committee is renewed annually, for example Resolution 2727 of 15 December 1970 and Resolution 2851 of 20 December 1971.

Israel has refused to allow the Special Committee access to the disputed territories and has refused to participate in its inquiries.

Reports

References

External links
UNGA, Resolution 42/160. Report of the Special Committee to Investigate Israeli Practices Affecting the Human Rights of the Population of the Occupied Territories. 8 December 1987 [doc.nr. A/RES/42/160(A-G)].
UNGA, Resolution 44/48. Report of the Special Committee to Investigate Israeli Practices Affecting the Human Rights of the Population of the Occupied Territories. 8 December 1989 [doc.nr. A/RES/44/48(A-G)]

Notes
Silverburg, Sanford R. (2002). Palestine and International Law: Essays on Politics and Economics. McFarland & Company. 

Israeli–Palestinian conflict and the United Nations
Human rights in Israel
Human rights abuses in the State of Palestine